New Hope, officially known as New Hope — Unity for Israel, is a centre-right to right-wing conservative and national-liberal political party in Israel.

History
The party was formed by former Likud MK and former minister Gideon Sa'ar on 8 December 2020, with Sa'ar subsequently submitting his resignation from the Knesset on 9 December. On the same day, Derekh Eretz MKs Yoaz Hendel and Zvi Hauser announced that they would join New Hope. Likud MKs Yifat Shasha-Biton, Michal Shir, Sharren Haskel, and Ze'ev Elkin later joined as well. Meir Yitzhak Halevi joined the party on 28 December. Benny Begin and Dani Dayan joined on 21 January 2021, whilst MK Hila Vazan joined on 31 January.

The party signed a surplus-vote agreement with Yamina on 4 January 2021.

On 10 July 2022, New Hope formed a joint list with Blue and White, led by Benny Gantz, ahead of the upcoming legislative election.

Policy 
New Hope sees the State of Israel as the nation state of the Jewish people and sees importance in military, economic, technological, research, settlement aspects of the state, with support for immigration to Israel. The party sees social divisions in Israel as problematic and promises to work for reconciliation and connection between parts of the nation.

Financial policy 
The party supports a partially mixed economy with a strong and partially subsidized capitalist focus. It advocates an expansion of the technological sector and of Israel's infrastructure, as well as supporting a reduction in the size of the country's bureaucracy. It also supports an expansion of Israel's social safety net, and grants for small businesses.

Government reform 
New Hope supports term limits, with a proposal to limit the tenure of a prime minister to eight years. In addition, their platform includes a proposal to elect the Knesset via mixed-member representation.

The party is also interested in increasing the powers of local government at the expense of the powers of the central government.

Leaders

Election results

Knesset members

References

External links

 

Political parties in Israel
Conservative parties in Israel
Zionist political parties in Israel
Likud breakaway groups
Political parties established in 2020
2020 establishments in Israel
National conservative parties
National liberal parties
Right-wing politics in Israel
Right-wing parties
Centre-right parties in Asia